Neoga Community Unit School District 3 is a unified school district located in the central Illinois city of Neoga, for which the district is named. Neoga, in turn, is a city located in northwestern Cumberland County. The district is composed of two schools: one elementary school and one junior-senior high school compose the unified district. Education begins at Neoga Elementary School, where children in grades ranging from kindergarten to five are educated; the school also runs a prekindergarten program. The last branch of precollegiate education in the district takes place at the combined Neoga Junior/Senior High School, and students in grades six through twelve are taught in this facility. The district's mascot is the Indian.

See also
List of school districts in Illinois

External links
District website

References

GreatSchools.net Information on Neoga Cusd 3, retrieved 2008-6-15

Education in Cumberland County, Illinois
School districts in Illinois